Mozilla Thunderbird is a free and open-source cross-platform email client, personal information manager, news client, RSS and chat client that is operated by the Mozilla Foundation's subsidiary MZLA Technologies Corporation. Thunderbird is an independent, community-driven project that is managed and overseen by the Thunderbird Council, which is elected by the Thunderbird Community. The project strategy was originally modeled after that of Mozilla's Firefox web browser and is an interface built on top of that web browser.

Features
Thunderbird is an email, newsgroup, news feed, and chat (XMPP/IRC) client with personal information manager (PIM) functionality, inbuilt since version 78.0 and previously available from the Lightning calendar extension. Additional features are available from extensions.

Message management
Thunderbird manages multiple email, newsgroup, and news feed accounts and supports multiple identities within accounts. Features such as quick search, saved search folders ("virtual folders"), advanced message filtering, message grouping, and tags help manage and find messages. On Linux-based systems, system mail (movemail) accounts were supported until version 91.0. Thunderbird provides basic support for system-specific new email notifications and can be extended with advanced notification support using an add-on.

Junk filtering
Thunderbird incorporates a Bayesian spam filter, a whitelist based on the included address book, and can also understand classifications by server-based filters such as SpamAssassin.

Extensions and themes
Extensions allow the addition of features through the installation of XPInstall modules (known as "XPI" or "zippy" installation) via the add-ons website that also features an update functionality to update the extensions.

Thunderbird supports a variety of themes for changing its overall look and feel. These packages of CSS and image files can be downloaded via the add-ons website at Mozilla Add-ons.

Standards support
Thunderbird follows industry standards for email:
 POP. Basic email retrieval protocol.
 IMAP. Thunderbird has implemented many of the capabilities in IMAP, in addition to adding their own extensions and the de facto standards by Google and Apple.
 LDAP address auto-completion.
 S/MIME: Inbuilt support for email encryption and signing using X.509 keys provided by a centralised certificate authority.
 OpenPGP: Inbuilt support for email encryption and signing since version 78.2.1, while older versions used extensions such as Enigmail.

For web feeds (e.g. news aggregators), it supports Atom and RSS.

For chat, it supports the IRC and XMPP protocol.

For newsfeeds, it uses NNTP and supports NNTPS.

File formats supported
Thunderbird provides mailbox format support using plugins, but this feature is not yet enabled due to related work in progress. The mailbox formats supported  are:
 mbox – Unix mailbox format (one file holding many emails)
 maildir – known as maildir-lite (one file per email).  "there are still many bugs", so this is disabled by default.

Thunderbird also uses Mork and (since version 3) MozStorage (which is based on SQLite) for its internal database. Mork was due to be replaced with MozStorage in Thunderbird 3.0, but the 8.0 release still uses the Mork file format.

Big file linking
Since version 38, Thunderbird has integrated support for automatic linking of large files instead of attaching them directly to the mail message.

HTML formatting and code insertion
Thunderbird provides a wysiwyg editor for composing messages formatted with HTML (default). The delivery format auto-detect feature will send unformatted messages as plain text (controlled by a user preference). Certain special formatting like subscript, superscript and strikethrough is available from the Format menu. The Insert > HTML menu provides the ability to edit the HTML source code of the message. There is basic support for HTML template messages, which are stored in a dedicated templates folder for each account.

Markdown support is provided through the Markdown here Revival add-on.

Limitations and known issues
As with any software, there may be limitations to the number and sizes of files and objects represented. For example, POP3 folders are subject to filesystem design limitations, such as maximum file sizes on filesystems that do not have large-file support, as well as possible limitations of long filenames, and other issues.

Cross-platform support
Thunderbird runs on a variety of platforms. Releases available on the primary distribution site support the following operating systems:
 Linux
 Windows
 macOS

Unofficial ports are available for:
 FreeBSD
 OpenBSD

Ports for older versions available for OS/2 (including ArcaOS and eComStation).

The source code is freely available and can be compiled to be run on a variety of other architectures and operating systems.

Android version 
In June 2022, the Thunderbird project announced that it would be collaborating with email client K-9 for Android to build a Thunderbird version for Android. To this end, K-9 lead developer Christian Ketterer joined the Thunderbird team in 2022. The plan was to transform K-9 Mail into Thunderbird on Android, including the respective name change and adoption of the Thunderbird branding. As soon as K-9 Mail had been brought into alignment with Thunderbird's feature set and visual appearance, this changeover would  take place, according to Thunderbird's Jason Evangelho.

Internationalization and localization
With contributors all over the world, Thunderbird has been translated into more than 65 languages, although email addresses are currently limited to ASCII local parts. Thunderbird does not yet support SMTPUTF8 (RFC 6531) or Email Address Internationalization.

Security
Thunderbird provides security features such as TLS/SSL connections to IMAP and SMTP servers.  It also offers inbuilt support for secure email with digital signing and message encryption through OpenPGP (using public and private keys) or S/MIME (using certificates). Any of these security features can take advantage of smartcards with the installation of additional extensions.

Other security features may be added through extensions. Up to version 68, the Enigmail extension was required for OpenPGP support (now inbuilt).

Optional security protections also include disabling loading of remote images within messages, enabling only specific media types (sanitizer), and disabling JavaScript.

The French military uses Thunderbird and contributes to its security features, which are claimed to match the requirements for NATO's closed messaging system.

History

Originally launched as Minotaur shortly after Phoenix (the original name for Mozilla Firefox), the project failed to gain momentum. With the success of Firefox, however, demand increased for a mail client to go with it, and the work on Minotaur was revived under the new name of Thunderbird, and migrated to the new toolkit developed by the Firefox team.

On December 7, 2004, version 1.0 was released, and received more than 500,000 downloads in its first three days of release, and 1,000,000 in ten days.

Significant work on Thunderbird restarted with the announcement that from version 1.5 onward the main Mozilla suite would be designed around separate applications using this new toolkit. This contrasts with the previous all-in-one approach, allowing users to mix and match the Mozilla applications with alternatives. The original Mozilla Suite continues to be developed as SeaMonkey.

On December 23, 2004, Project Lightning was announced which tightly integrated calendar functionality (scheduling, tasks, etc.) into Thunderbird. Lightning supports the full range of calendar mechanisms and protocols supported by the Mozilla Calendar infrastructure, just as with modern (post-0.2) Sunbird.

On October 11, 2006, Qualcomm and the Mozilla Foundation announced that "future versions of Eudora will be based upon the same technology platform as the open source Mozilla Thunderbird email program." The project was code-named Penelope.

In late 2006, Debian rebranded Thunderbird as Icedove due to trademark and copyright reasons. This was the second product to be rebranded.

On July 26, 2007, the Mozilla Foundation announced that Thunderbird would be developed by an independent organization, because the Mozilla Corporation (a subsidiary of the foundation) was focusing on Mozilla Firefox development.

On September 17, 2007, the Mozilla Foundation announced the funding of a new internet communications initiative with David Ascher of ActiveState. The purpose of this initiative was "to develop Internet communications software based on the Thunderbird product, code, and brand".

On February 19, 2008, Mozilla Messaging started operations as a subsidiary of the Mozilla Foundation responsible for the development of email and similar communications. Its initial focus was on the then upcoming version of Thunderbird 3. Alpha Preview releases of Thunderbird 3 were codenamed "Shredder". On April 4, 2011, Mozilla Messaging was merged into the Mozilla Labs group of the Mozilla Foundation.

On July 6, 2012, a confidential memo from Jb Piacentino, the Thunderbird Managing Director at Mozilla, was leaked and published to TechCrunch. The memo indicated that Mozilla would be moving some of the team off the project and further development of new features would be left up to the community. The memo was slated for release on July 9, 2012. A subsequent article by the Executive Chair of Mozilla, Mitchell Baker, stated Mozilla's decision to make a transition of Thunderbird to a new release and governance model. On July 6, 2012, Mozilla announced the company was dropping the priority of Thunderbird development because the continuous effort to extend Thunderbird's feature set was mostly fruitless. The new development model shifted to Mozilla offering only "Extended Support Releases", which deliver security and maintenance updates, while allowing the community to take over the development of new features.

On November 25, 2014, Kent James of the volunteer-led Thunderbird Council announced on the Thunderbird blog that active contributors to Thunderbird gathered at the Mozilla office in Toronto and discussed the future of the application. They decided that more staff were required working full-time on Thunderbird so that the Thunderbird Team could release a stable and reliable product and make progress on features that had been frequently requested by the community.

On December 1, 2015, Mozilla Executive Chair Mitchell Baker announced in a company-wide memo that Thunderbird development needed to be uncoupled from Firefox. She referred to Thunderbird developers spending large efforts responding to changes to Mozilla technologies, while Firefox was paying a tax to support Thunderbird development. She also said that she does not believe Thunderbird has the potential for "industry-wide impact" that Firefox does. Mozilla remained interested in having a role in Thunderbird, but sought more assistance to help with development. Therefore, at the same time, it was announced that Mozilla Foundation would provide at least a temporary legal and financial home for the Thunderbird project.

On May 9, 2017, Philipp Kewisch announced that the Mozilla Foundation would continue to serve as the legal and fiscal home for the Thunderbird project, but that Thunderbird would migrate off Mozilla Corporation infrastructure, separating the operational aspects of the project. Mozilla brought Thunderbird back in-house in an announcement on May 9, 2017, and continued to support its development. The Thunderbird development team expanded by adding several new members and overhauled security and the user interface.

The interim/beta versions Thunderbird 57 and 58, released in late 2017, began to make changes influenced by Firefox Quantum, including a new "Photon" user interface. 

Despite the removal in Firefox Quantum of support for XUL-based legacy add-ons in favor of WebExtensions, the stable/ESR release of Thunderbird 60 in mid-2018 continued to support them, although most would require updates, and it did not support WebExtensions except for Themes. 

In 2018, work was underway for planned support in Thunderbird 63 of WebExtensions and to continue to "somewhat" support legacy addons, according to Mozilla.

With the release of Thunderbird 68 in August 2019 it now only supports WebExtension addons. Legacy Addons can still be used if a special "legacy mode" is enabled, but even for this, the legacy Addon has to be converted. Alongside the transition, OpenPGP support was integrated directly into Thunderbird as a standard feature, seeking to supplant the Enigmail extension. Mainly for licensing reasons, this is no longer based on GnuPG, but on the RNP library, which has more liberal licensing terms.

On January 28, 2020, the Mozilla Foundation announced that the project would henceforth be operating from a new wholly owned subsidiary, MZLA Technologies Corporation, in order to explore offering products and services that were not previously possible and to collect revenue through partnerships and non-charitable donations.

As of version 78.7.1, Thunderbird will no longer allow installation of addons that use Legacy WebExtensions. Only MailExtensions are now compatible with Thunderbird. MailExtensions are WebExtensions but with "some added features specific to Thunderbird".

Thunderbird 91 features various UI improvements (including a new account setup workflow), Apple silicon support, CardDAV address book support, built-in import and export tools for Thunderbird profiles, the PDF.js PDF viewer, and the ability to encrypt emails to BCC recipients.

On June 13, 2022, it was announced that the Mozilla Thunderbird team would take over development of the Android email client app K-9 Mail, with plans for it to eventually become a mobile version of Thunderbird with synchronisation support.

Releases
Thunderbird development releases occur in three stages, called Beta, Earlybird, and Daily, which correspond to Firefox's Beta, Aurora, and Nightly stages. The release dates and Gecko versions are exactly the same as Firefox; for example, Firefox 7 and Thunderbird 7 were both released on September 27, 2011, and were both based on Gecko 7.0.

References

External links

 

 
2003 software
Cross-platform free software
Email client software for Linux
Free email software
Free multilingual software
Free software programmed in C++
Free Usenet clients
Gecko-based software
macOS email clients
News aggregator software
OS/2 software
Portable software
Software that uses SQLite
Software that uses XUL
Software using the Mozilla license
Unix Internet software
Windows email clients